is a quasi-national park in the Kantō region of Honshū in Japan. It is rated a protected landscape (category V) according to the IUCN. The park includes numerous widely separated portions of the coastal areas of southern Bōsō Peninsula, ranging from Cape Futtsu on Tokyo Bay to the west, to Cape Inubō facing the Pacific Ocean in the east. A portion of the park, located offshore the city of Katsuura has been designated as an underwater marine park since June 7, 1974.
With the location of the park near to the Tokyo Metropolis, and its mild climate, the area attracts many visitors for water sports, camping, and flower viewing.

Like all Quasi-National Parks in Japan, the park is managed by local prefectural governments.

Jurisdictions 

Minami Bōsō Quasi-National Park includes parts of nine jurisdictions in Chiba Prefecture.
Futtsu
Kimitsu
Minamibōsō
Tateyama
Kamogawa
Katsuura
Isumi
Kyonan
Onjuku

Notable places

Bays and harbors 
Bay of Tateyama

Capes 
Cape Myōgane
Cape Taitō
Cape Hachiman, Isumi
Cape Hachiman, Katsuura

Mountains 

Mount Tomi
Mount Nokogiri

Lighthouses 

Nojimazaki Lighthouse

Castle remains 

Katsuura Castle, Katsuura
Sanuki Castle, Futtsu

See also

List of national parks of Japan

References
Southerland, Mary and Britton, Dorothy. The National Parks of Japan. Kodansha International (1995).

External links
Japan National Tourism Organization

National parks of Japan
Parks and gardens in Chiba Prefecture
Protected areas established in 1958